José Aníbal Peres de Pontes (born 9 August 1947 in Guajará-Mirim) is a Brazilian economist and politician, affiliated to the Brazilian Social Democracy Party (PSDB). Took office as senator temporarily after José Serra was appointed by acting president Michel Temer as Minister of Foreign Affairs.

Controversies
In 2014, was investigated in the inquiry that investigated frauds in biddings for the constructions of trains and the subway, scandal that was known as trensalão, in São Paulo, during governments of the PSDB. This investigation was discontinued by the First Group of the Supreme Federal Court (STF). In that time, the majority of justices understood having no enough evidences of involvement, considering that other witnesses denied their participation in the case. By a note, José Aníbal said the complaints against him have no "factual sustentation" and are based in a "apocryphal, false document".

References

1947 births
Living people
Brazilian economists
Workers' Party (Brazil) politicians
Brazilian Democratic Movement politicians
Brazilian Social Democracy Party politicians
Brazilian people of Spanish descent
University of São Paulo alumni